Baldan is both an Italian (mainly Veneto) and Mongolian surname and a given name. Notable people with the name include:
Baldan Tsyzhipov (born 1990), Russian freestyle wrestler
Albino Baldan (1925-1991), Italian rower
Dario Baldan Bembo (born 1948), Italian composer
Ferry Mursyidan Baldan (1961-2022), Indonesian politician
Marco Baldan (born 1993), Italian footballer
Sodnom Baldan (1908-1979), Mongolian professor

See also
Baldan Bereeven Monastery, a Buddhist monastery in Mongolia

Italian-language surnames
Mongolian-language surnames